Marinas in Turkey, ports of call for international and local yachtsmen, are equipped with modern services routinely expected in recreational boating industry. They are found either in or near Istanbul or İzmir, the two largest port cities of the country whose economies are focused on tourism in the Aegean Sea or the Mediterranean Sea, with a particular concentration in southwest Anatolia.

The country's increasing popularity in nautical tourism is advantaged by its coastline and a past noted for the seafaring literature, some of whose references are part of everyday culture, as is the case for the Blue Cruise, and the search for the Golden Fleece. It is noteworthy to recall that, apart from the larger installations listed below, there are also numerous points of stop and supply which offer the advantages inherent to smaller enterprises, sometimes in a family environment, at the same time as putting the geography of the Turkish coasts to good use. 

Since recent years , these installations offer the modern infrastructure and facilities that are considered as requirements with increasing rapidity and sophistication, catering a whole range of services. Sizable investments by non-Turkish investors have been made in some of the marina installations below and prominent Turkish private sector groups view marinas as an attractive investment that also enhances their prestige, and thus have built or acquired one to include in their overall portfolio.

List of facilities

There are close to three dozen marinas currently (2010) operational in Turkey. Many of these were initially constructed through public investment, and later purchased and fine-tuned by the private sector.

Profiles of operating companies

Palmarina Bodrum

Palmarina Bodrum is located in Yalıkavak, the southern tip of the Aegean Sea. Palmarina Bodrum, operating under the Blue Flag, is the only mega and giga yacht capacity marina of Turkey   hosting up to 69 Mega Yachts of 40 meters and above to dock all year around, as well as sail boats and motor yachts of various lengths.

Local specialist firms
Alaçatı Marina and İzmir's Levent Marina are operated by locally based enterprises and Ataköy Marina by a select yacht club. Alaçatı Marina is located within the compound of the ongoing and large-scale Port Alaçatı construction project intended for international holiday home-owners.

International investments
Port Göcek is managed by the British Camper and Nicholsons marina division CNMarinas, in a joint-venture with the owner, Turkey's Turkon Holding. The marina is part of an integrated leisure compound, at the tip of a natural park and complete with a Swissotel and the beach gravel brought over from Canada. In 2006, Camper and Nicholson also won the bid, together with IC Holding, for the completion works and the operating of Çeşme harbour marina. It will be the second built in this city.

Under construction
Turkey's priority agenda item in the field of nautical tourism remains the expansion of the zone with proper infrastructure and especially the introduction of her Black Sea coast to international yachting and developing this region's potential. To date, marina development in Turkey's Black Sea coast, adjusted to serve modern-day Argonauts, lags very much behind Turkey's other regions. 

The infrastructure for a 175-boat capacity marina is actually fully laid in Trabzon and Turkey's Ministry of Transport is seeking private investors for the complementary works and the operational commitments. Other investments in the same stage of readiness are the two marinas (500- and 200-boat capacity) within Mersin metropolitan area, two in Antalya Province (Alanya with 425-boat and Gazipaşa with 250-boat capacities), two more tendered and concluded investments in İzmir Province each with 400-boat capacities, in Sığacık and inside Çeşme harbour, and finally two small marinas for up to 100 boats in the district of Burhaniye in the Aegean Sea (neighboring Ayvalık) and in Kumburgaz coast of İstanbul's Silivri district, in the Sea of Marmara. Finally, the compound of İzmir's historic Konak Pier building is intended to be enlarged to include Turkey's largest marina, in Konak district in the heart of İzmir metropolitan area, once the suitable adjacent area is made available. The shopping mall part of Konak Pier is already in service since two years and houses up-market stores.

See also

 Tourism in Turkey
 Turkish Riviera
 Blue Cruise (Mavi Yolculuk)
 Gulet
 Taka
 List of ports in Turkey

References

External links

 Turkish Coast Guard Command - pages in English
 Turkish Navy Department of Navigation, Hydrography and Oceanography - Notices to mariners and other information in English

 
Marinas

Marinas
Marinas
Tourism in Northern Cyprus